| attendance = {{#expr:

 + 8245 + 11251 + 3129 + 4755 + 2670 + 4879 + 1537 + 5077 + 6357
 + 1679 + 600 + 12519 + 2667 + 15018 + 2116 + 200 + 3980 + 3013
 + 7500 + 5000 + 1700 + 5464 + 1500 + 3903 + 7105 + 7533 + 600
 + 6965 + 9500 + 14493 + 3248 + 3567 + 4744 + 4000 + 1500 + 100

}}
| matches = 36
| highest attendance =15,018 - Bristol Bears v Zebre Parma18 December 2022
| lowest attendance =200 - Cheetahs v Scarlets17 December 2022 
| top point scorer =  Sam Costelow (Scarlets)29 points
| top try scorer =  Josh Adams (Cardiff) Steff Evans (Scarlets)4 tries
| venue = Aviva Stadium, Dublin
| attendance
| website = EPCR Website
| previous tournament = 2021–22 European Rugby Challenge Cup
| previous year = 2021–22
| next tournament = 2023–24 European Rugby Challenge Cup
| next year = 2023–24
}}
The 2022–23 EPCR Challenge Cup is the eighth edition of the EPCR Challenge Cup, an annual second-tier rugby union competition for professional clubs. Including the predecessor competition, the original European Challenge Cup, this is the 27th edition of European club rugby's second-tier competition.

The tournament commenced in December 2022, and will conclude with the final on 19 May 2023 at Aviva Stadium, Dublin, Ireland.

This is the first year that teams from South Africa can qualify, following the inaugural United Rugby Championship season, with Johannesberg-based Lions making their inaugural appearance in European club rugby. In addition, another South African team, the Bloemfontein-based Cheetahs franchise, formerly of the URC predecessor competition the Pro14, have been invited to enter, having been excluded from European competition during their Pro14 tenure.

Teams
Seventeen teams will qualify for the 2022–23 EPCR Challenge Cup from Premiership Rugby, the Top 14 and the United Rugby Championship as a direct result of their domestic league performance having not qualified for the Heineken Champions Cup. Plus one invited sides making 18 teams.

The distribution of teams are:

 England: three teams
 Remaining teams in the Premiership that do not qualify for the 2022–23 European Rugby Champions Cup. Worcester Warriors and Wasps had previously qualified but were both suspended after entering administration.
 France: six teams
 Teams taking part in the 2022–23 Top 14 season that did not qualify for the Champions Cup
 Ireland, Italy, Scotland, Wales, South Africa: nine teams
 The bottom eight teams in the United Rugby Championship that do not win their URC Regional Shield 
 Cheetahs (invited to participate)

Team details

Pool stage
 

Teams were awarded four points for a win, two for a draw, one for scoring four tries in a game, and one for losing by less than eight points.

Pool A

Pool B

Knockout stage
The knockout stage will be played across the 31 March/1/2 April with a single leg round of 16 matches consisting of the top six ranked teams from each pool and the teams ranked 9th and 10th in each pool of the 2022–23 European Rugby Champions Cup (Clermont, Lyon, Racing 92 and Sale Sharks). The Round of 16 follows a pre-determined format, whilst the Quarter-Finals and Semi-Finals will always guarantee home advantage to the higher ranked team.

Bracket

Round of 16

Quarter-finals

Semi-finals
The higher-ranked club will gain home stadium advantage, however, in the event that a South African team is higher ranked, the game will be located in Europe.

Final

See also
 2022–23 European Rugby Champions Cup

Notes

References

 
European Rugby Challenge Cup
European Rugby Challenge Cup
European Rugby Challenge Cup
European Rugby Challenge Cup
European Rugby Challenge Cup
European Rugby Challenge Cup
European Rugby Challenge Cup
European Rugby Challenge Cup
European Rugby Challenge Cup
EPCR Challenge Cup seasons